General Weber may refer to:

Alois Weber (general) (1903–1976), German Wehrmacht major general
Christian Weber (SS general) (1883–1945), German SS brigadier general
Erich Weber (1860–1933), German Imperial Army general
Friedrich Weber (general) (1892–1974), German Wehrmacht lieutenant general
Friedrich Weber (veterinarian) (1892–1955), German SS general
Gottfried Weber (general) (1899–1958), German Wehrmacht lieutenant general
La Vern E. Weber (1923–1999), U.S. Army lieutenant general
Max Weber (general) (1824–1901), Union Army brigadier general

See also
Norman W. Webber (1881–1950), British Army brigadier general